Bread Loaf is an unincorporated community within the town of Ripton in Addison County, Vermont, United States. The community is on the west flank of Bread Loaf Mountain. The community formerly had a post office.

The Bread Loaf Writers' Conference, sponsored by Middlebury College, occurs annually in Bread Loaf.

References

Unincorporated communities in Vermont
Unincorporated communities in Addison County, Vermont